Turku Orthodox Church or the Church of the Holy Martyr Empress Alexandra is the main church of the Turku Orthodox parish located at the northwest corner of the Turku Market Square along the Yliopistonkatu street in Turku, Finland. The church was built under plans drafted by architect Carl Ludvig Engel and was ordered by Nicholas I of Russia on 5 January 1838. Construction, which began in 1839, cost 67,886 rubles and was completed in 1845. The church was consecrated on 2 September 1845. The church was dedicated to Alexandra, the spouse of Diocletian who had publicly become Christianised and suffered a martyr's death on 23 April 303. The choice of patron saint may have been due to Nicholas I's wife's name, Aleksandra Feodorovna.

Most of the icons of the iconostasis come from Valaam Monastery.

The Turku Orthodox church cemetery and cemetery chapel are located in Vasaramäki and there are other parish sanctuaries in Rauma and Salo.

See also
Finnish Orthodox Church

External links

Finnish Orthodox Church
Kirkon esittely Virtual Turku -sivustolla

Carl Ludvig Engel buildings
Churches in Turku
Church buildings with domes
Churches completed in 1845
Neoclassical church buildings in Finland
Finnish Orthodox churches